Matthew Brady (born 27 October 1977) is an English former footballer who played in the Football League for Barnet and Wycombe Wanderers.

References

External links

1977 births
Living people
Footballers from Greater London
English footballers
Association football forwards
Barnet F.C. players
Aylesbury F.C. players
Dover Athletic F.C. players
Boreham Wood F.C. players
Wycombe Wanderers F.C. players
English Football League players